Bajema is a surname. Notable people with the surname include:

 Billy Bajema (born 1982), American football player
 Kara Bajema (born 1998), American volleyball player